Wojciech Trochim (born 31 March 1989) is a Polish professional footballer who plays as a midfielder for Mazovia Mińsk Mazowiecki.

Career

Club
Trochim was born in Mińsk Mazowiecki. In February 2011, he joined Sandecja Nowy Sącz.

International
He was also a member of Poland national under-19 football team.

Poland U-19 Goals

References

External links
 
 

Living people
1989 births
People from Mińsk Mazowiecki
Sportspeople from Masovian Voivodeship
Association football midfielders
Polish footballers
Poland youth international footballers
Legia Warsaw II players
Legia Warsaw players
Ząbkovia Ząbki players
Bałtyk Gdynia players
Sandecja Nowy Sącz players
Warta Poznań players
Zagłębie Lubin players
Kolejarz Stróże players
Podbeskidzie Bielsko-Biała players
GKS Tychy players
GKS Katowice players
Chojniczanka Chojnice players
KSZO Ostrowiec Świętokrzyski players
MKP Pogoń Siedlce players
Ekstraklasa players
III liga players
II liga players
I liga players